Pediatric nursing is part of the nursing profession, specifically revolving around the care of neonates and children up to adolescence. The word, pediatrics, comes from the Greek words 'paedia' (child) and 'iatrike' (physician). 'Paediatrics' is the British/Australian spelling, while 'pediatrics' is the American spelling.

Disciplines

Direct nursing 
Nursing functions vary regionally, by individual education, experience, and individual career goals. These functions include the administration of procedures and medicines according to prescribed nursing care plans. Nurses observe vital signs and develop communication skills with children and family members, as well as with other medical personnel. Awareness of the concerns of children and parents, physical presence at times of stress, and helping children and family members cope are common functions of direct nursing care

Neonatal nursing 
Neonatal nurses specialize in working with the youngest patients(infants). Neonatal nursing focuses on providing care and support for newborn babies delivered prematurely or who are suffering from health problems such as birth defects, infections, or heart deformities. Many neonatal nurses work in a Neonatal Intensive Care Unit (NICU) providing specialized medical care to at-risk newborns.

A dysmature newborn "is one whose developmental level is poor at birth. These newborns require a special type of care, due to their health issues, such as:

 Inadequate respiratory function 
 Poor control of body temperature
 Increased tendency to bleed
 Poor resistance to infection 
 Poor nutrition
 Immature kidneys and skin 
 Jaundice

Neonatal nurses employ medical techniques, including the use of incubators. Essentially, the incubator "provide[s] proper heat, humidity, oxygen, and mist... and protection from infection." The medical apparatus provides essential medical care for at-risk newborns.

Emergency nursing 
Pediatric nurses are expected to provide a quick response to stressful circumstances in life-threatening situations. Key features of pediatric emergency nursing include:
 Handling multifaceted trauma, injury or illness cases without letting the patients succumb to the urgency of the situation
 Stabilizing patients 
 Quickly diagnosing conditions and providing on-spot solutions
 Administering appropriate medications to address pain
 Upgrading skills and knowledge
 Remaining patient and caring for the traumatized families accompanying the patient
 Maintaining equanimity around patients who do not improve.

Pediatric nurse practitioners 
Pediatric nurse practitioner must attend school for at least two years after earning a bachelor's degree, pass an examination, and apply to their state board of nursing.

Psychiatric Nursing 
Some pediatric nurses can choose to return to school for their masters in psychiatric nursing. Pediatric psychiatric nurses are responsible for caring for children and adolescents with psychiatric problems.

Goals
 Normalize the life of the child during hospitalization.
 Minimize the impact of the child's unique condition.
 Foster growth and development.
 Develop realistic, functional and coordinated home care plans.
 Respect the roles of the families.
Prevent disease and promote health.

Training

Australia 
A registered nursing license is required to practice. A registered nurse requires a Bachelor of Science (Nursing), a 3–4 years full-time training. Once completed 12–18 months in a clinical setting is required, followed by completing a graduate certificate in pediatric nursing.

United States 
The CPN (certified pediatric nurse) exam validates knowledge and expertise beyond the prerequisite Registered Nurse (RN) licensure. Eligible RNs may have a diploma, associate's degree, BSN, MSN, or higher nursing degree and must have a minimum of 1800 hours of pediatric nursing experience. Over 30,000 nurses actively held CPN certification as of April 15, 2021.

Training involves a mix of formal education and clinical experiences. Pediatric nurses can become certified in the field and may choose to further specialize. Students can enroll in an associate or bachelor's degree program. Some diploma programs offered exclusively through hospitals may also prepare students for the RN exam.

Global development

Southern and eastern Africa 
Strengthening the pediatric nursing workforce has been recommended as a primary strategy to reduce under-five mortality in African nations. Children make up close to half the population in many African countries, but research suggests that children's nurses often make up less than 1% of the nursing workforce: a 2019 workforce survey found approximately 4,000 qualified children's nurses in South Africa, Uganda, Zambia, Malawi and Kenya. The majority (8/10) were in South Africa.

Career overview 

Pediatric nurses work in settings including doctor's offices and community-based settings to hospitals and critical care facilities. Pediatric nurses may assist pediatricians or work alongside them. Pediatric nurses offer primary care services such as diagnosing and treating common childhood illnesses and conducting developmental screenings. Acute care and specialty services are also available for the chronically ill. Some pediatric nurses and nurse practitioners specialize in areas such as cardiology, dermatology, gastroenterology or oncology. Pediatric nurses are responsible for helping patients adapt to a hospital setting and prepare them for medical treatments and procedures. Nurses also coach parents to observe and wait for important signs and responses to therapies, to increase the child's comfort, and even to provide ongoing care.

Education 
Pediatric nursing specialties require specialized education. Nurses must first become a registered nurse (RN), gain experience in a pediatric health care facility and then pass the Certified Pediatric Nurse (CPN) exam. If a CPN wants to become a Pediatric Nurse Practitioner, they must return to school to receive their masters. 45% of undergraduate pediatric nursing students reported a lack of student direct care clinical learning opportunities with children

Counseling 
Injury-prevention strategies and anticipatory guidance are provided via counseling. Helping the child or family solve a problem is often a focus, usually provided by advanced practice nurses or other experienced nurses.

Advocacy 
The effective advocate nurse must be aware of the child's and the family's needs, the family's resources, and available health care services. Nurses help reinforce families to help them make knowledgeable choices about medical services and to act in the child's best interests.

References

Further reading

  
 
  
  
 
  
 of pediatric emergency nursing.  
  
  
  
 

Hospital nursing
Pediatrics